Peter Smith Michie (March 24, 1839 - February 16, 1901) was an American educator and soldier.

Biography
He was born in Brechin, Scotland, came to the United States in 1843, and was brought up in Cincinnati. He graduated second in the class of 1863 at West Point and entered the engineer corps. During the Civil War, he served in the campaign of 1864 against Richmond, Virginia; was chief engineer of General Benjamin Butler's Army of the James during the construction of the Dutch Gap Canal; and was at the head of all engineering operations of the left column at Hatcher's Run and in the pursuit of General Robert E. Lee's army.

After the war, having attained brevet rank of brigadier in 1865, he was for a year engaged in the government survey of the theatre of the war. From 1867 to 1869 he taught various branches at West Point; was member of a coastal fortification commission which visited Europe in 1870; and for the last thirty years of his life was professor of natural and experimental philosophy at West Point. He was an overseer of the Thayer School of Civil Engineering at Dartmouth College (1871-1901).

Michie died in West Point, New York and was buried at the West Point Cemetery on February 18, 1901.

Works
 Elements of Wave Motion Relating to Sound and Light (1882)
 The Life and Letters of Emory Upton (1885)
 Elements of Analytical Mechanics (1886)
 The Personnel of Sea-Coast Defense (1887)
 Hydrodynamics (1888)
 Practical Astronomy (1891)
 General McClellan (“Great Commanders Series,” New York, 1901)

References

1839 births
1901 deaths
People from Brechin
Scottish emigrants to the United States
United States Military Academy alumni
Military personnel from Cincinnati
American military engineers
People of Ohio in the American Civil War
Union Army generals
United States Army officers
United States Military Academy faculty
American educators
Writers from Cincinnati
People from West Point, New York
Burials at West Point Cemetery